Rosenlewin Urheilijat-38 (Finnish for Rosenlew Athletes-38) was a sports club owned by the Rosenlew factories. The club was formed in 1938 but the hockey team was formed in the 1950s. RU-38 won the Finnish Championships in ice hockey in 1967 and the Finnish Cup in 1965.

History 

RU-38 won the Finnish championship in 1967 and the Finnish Cup in 1965. RU-38 got merged with Porin Karhut in 1967 to form Porin Ässät.

Famous players 
 Raimo Kilpiö 
 Matti Keinonen
 Matti Lampainen
 Kalevi Rassa

Other 
In 1967 RU-38 participated in a movie called Billion Dollar Brain by performing a hockey fight with Karhu-Kissat.

References 

Ice hockey teams in Finland 
Defunct ice hockey teams in Europe
Ice hockey clubs established in 1938
Sport in Pori
Sport in Satakunta
Ässät